Carinascincus microlepidotus, the boulder cool-skink or southern snow skink is a species of skink in the family Scincidae.  It is endemic to Australia, found in Tasmania.

References

Carinascincus
Skinks of Australia
Endemic fauna of Australia
Reptiles described in 1874
Taxa named by Arthur William Edgar O'Shaughnessy]